This is a list of the radio stations in Turkey.

İstanbul 

 FM 87.60 - DAMLA FM
 FM 87.80 - X RADIO
 FM 88.00 - RADYO 34
 FM 88.20 - TRT RADYO 3
 FM 88.40 - LALEGÜL FM
 FM 88.60 - İSTANBUL FM
 FM 88.80 - TRT RADYO HABER
 FM 89.00 - JOY TÜRK
 FM 89.20 - ALEM FM
 FM 89.40 - SIARAY TÜRK
 FM 89.60 - KAFA RADYO
 FM 89.80 - SHOW RADYO
 FM 90.00 - RADYO VİVA
 FM 90.20 - A HABER RADYO
 FM 90.40 - HABERTÜRK RADYO
 FM 90.60 - RADYO 2000 
 FM 90.80 - SUPER FM
 FM 91.00 - RADYO ALATURKA
 FM 91.20 - RADYO 45'LİK
 FM 91.40 - TRT FM
 FM 91.60 - KISS FM
 FM 91.80 - İSTANBULUN SESİ
 FM 92.00 - KRAL FM
 FM 92.20 - RADYO KLASİK
 FM 92.40 - LİG RADYO
 FM 92.60 - RADYO CNN TURK
 FM 92.80 - BLOOMBERG HT RADYO
 FM 93.00 - A SPOR RADYO
 FM 93.20 - TGRT FM
 FM 93.40 - KARADENİZİN SESİ
 FM 93.60 - RADYO TURKUVAZ
 FM 93.80 - Radyo FG
 FM 94.00 - MEDYA FM
 FM 94.20 - POLİS RADYOSU
 FM 94.40 - RADYO EKİN
 FM 94.60 - MISK FM
 FM 94.80 - KRAL POP
 FM 95.00 - AÇIK RADYO
 FM 95.20 - DİYANET RADYO
 FM 95.40 - SLOW TURK
 FM 95.60 - TRT RADYO 1
 FM 95.80 - RADYO GOL
 FM 96.00 - LOUNGE FM
 FM 96.20 - RADYO EKSEN
 FM 96.40 - CEM RADYO
 FM 96.60 - YÖN RADYO
 FM 96.80 - MORAL FM
 FM 97.00 - RADYO FENERBAHÇE
 FM 97.20 - METRO FM
 FM 97.60 - RADYO TRAFİK MARMARA
 FM 97.80 - RS FM
 FM 98.00 - DİYANET RADYO
 FM 98.20 - KARADENİZ FM
 FM 98.40 - BEST FM
 FM 98.60 - NUMBER 1 TURK
 FM 98.80 - STAR ARTI
 FM 99.20 - PAL NOSTALJİ
 FM 99.40 - RADYO BABYLON
 FM 99.60 - TRT RADYO 4
 FM 99.80 - POWER TÜRK
 FM 100.00 - POWER FM
 FM 100.20 - POWER PLUS FM
 FM 100.40 - Radyo Fenomen
 FM 100.60 - JOY FM
 FM 100.80 - ULUSAL RADYO
 FM 101.00 - POWER POP
 FM 101.20 - RADYO SEMERKAND
 FM 101.40 - TRT ARAPÇA
 FM 101.60 - TRT NAĞME
 FM 101.80 - RADYO MEGA
 FM 102.00 - LUXURY LOUNGE
 FM 102.20 - SEYR FM
 FM 102.40 - NUMBER ONE FM
 FM 102.60 - DİYANET RADYO
 FM 102.80 - NTV RADYO
 FM 103.00 - METEOROLOJİNİN SESİ RADYOSU
 FM 103.20 - ÖZEL FM
 FM 103.40 - TRT TÜRKÜ
 FM 103.60 - RADYO LIGHT
 FM 103.80 - RADYO TATLISES
 FM 104.00 - RADYO D
 FM 104.20 - RADYO TRAFİK
 FM 104.40 - BİZİM RADYO
 FM 104.60 - RADYO 7
 FM 104.80 - TRT RADYO HABER
 FM 105.00 - ERKAM RADYO
 FM 105.20 - TRT RADYO 1
 FM 105.40 - HABERTÜRK RADYO
 FM 105.60 - BABA RADYO
 FM 105.80 - ST ENDÜSTRİ RADYO
 FM 106.00 - PAL STATİON
 FM 106.20 - VIRGIN RADIO TURKEY
 FM 106.40 - DİYANET KUR'AN RADYO
 FM 106.60 - PAL FM
 FM 107.00 - RADYO SEYMEN
 FM 107.20 - RADYO SPOR
 FM 107.40 - RADYO VOYAGE
 FM 107.60 - AKRA FM
 FM 107.80 - RADYO HEVİ

Ankara 

 87.5 - KAFA RADYO
 87.7 - PAL FM
 88.0 - TRT FM (ÇALDAĞ)
 88.2 - DİYANET KUR'AN RADYO
 88.4 - RADYO TRAFİK ANKARA
 88.6 - BABA RADYO
 88.8 - SHOW RADYO
 89.0 - CNN TÜRK RADYO
 89.2 - DOST FM
 89.8 - RADYO 7
 90.0 - TRT RADYO HABER (ELMADAĞ)
 90.2 - RADYO TURKUVAZ
 90.4 - HABERTÜRK RADYO
 90.6 - RADYO 2000
 90.8 - SÜPER FM
 91.0 - RADYO İLEF
 91.2 - TRT RADYO 3 (ÇALDAĞ)
 91.4 - PAL NOSTALJİ
 91.6 - CRI TÜRK FM
 91.8 - HEDEF RADYO
 92.1 - RADYO DENGE
 92.4 - METEOROLOJİNİN SESİ RADYOSU
 92.7 - RADYO SES
 93.0 - RADYO VİZYON
 93.3 - TRT RADYO 1
 93.6 - RADYO VİVA
 93.8 - VIRGIN RADIO TÜRKİYE
 94.0 - DİYANET KUR'AN RADYO
 94.2 - RADYO BEYAZ
 94.4 - POLİS RADYOSU
 94.6 - DİYANET RADYO
 94.8 - MAKRO FM
 95.0 - TRT RADYO HABER (ÇALDAĞ)
 95.3 - SLOWTÜRK RADYO
 95.5 - POLİS RADYOSU
 95.8 - MAX FM
 96.0 - OSTİM RADYO
 96.2 - RS FM
 96.4 - A SPOR RADYO
 96.6 - RADYO BİLKENT
 96.8 - PARK FM
 97.0 - RADYO FENERBAHÇE
 97.2 - METRO FM
 97.6 - NUMBER ONE TÜRK
 97.8 - RADYO SPOR
 98.0 - RADYO SHEMA
 98.3 - BEST FM
 98.6 - TRT TÜRKÜ
 98.8 - RADYO FENOMEN
 99.1 - RADYO BANKO
 99.3 - PAL STATION
 99.5 - RADYO FENOMEN
 99.7 - A HABER RADYO
 100.0 - POWER FM
 100.3 - TRT FM (ELMADAĞ)
 100.5 - ATLANTİS FM
 100.7 - KAFA RADYO
 100.9 - PAL DOĞA
 101.1 - RADYO MEGASİTE
 101.3 - TRT RADYO HABER (YENİMAHALLE)
 101.5 - NUMBER ONE FM
 101.8 - KRAL POP RADYO
 102.1 - AŞK FM
 102.4 - KRAL FM
 102.6 - RADYO MEGA
 102.8 - TRT NAĞME
 103.1 - RADYO ÖDTÜ
 103.4 - MORAL FM
 103.6 - TRT RADYO 3 (ELMADAĞ)
 103.8 - RADYO 06
 104.0 - RADYO D
 104.2 - RADYO BAŞKENT
 104.4 - TGRT FM
 104.7 - NTV RADYO
 104.9 - ERKAM RADYO
 105.1 - ÖZGÜR RADYO
 105.3 - ALEM FM
 105.6 - TRT RADYO 4
 105.8 - SEMERKAND RADYO
 106.0 - JOYTÜRK
 106.3 - ÖMÜR RADYO
 106.5 - JOY FM
 106.7 - RADYO ANKARA
 106.9 - POWERTÜRK
 107.1 - AVRASYA TÜRK
 107.4 - AKRA FM
 107.8 - TRT RADYO 1 (YENİMAHALLE)

Tekirdağ 
FM 102.1 - TEMPO FM

Tokat 
FM 101.03 - YÖRE FM
FM 92.00 - RADYO TOKAT
FM 90.05 - RADYO EXTRA

Antalya 
 FM 93.0 - Damga FM
 FM 93.3 - Wrong Soul Radio Station
 FM 93.5 - OLAY FM
 FM 95.0 - RADYO AKDENİZ
 FM 95.5 - Radyo Mc Likya FM
 FM 96.0 - RADYO TOROS LINE
 FM 96.5 - RADYO MUBA
 FM 98.0 - RADYO MARTI
 FM 103.1 - RADYO KUMSAL
 FM 105.0 - Antalya Fm
 FM 106.4 - SET FM
 FM 107.6 - RADYO UMUT

Trabzon 
 Radyo Aktif (Fm 94.0 MHz) (Yerel R3 Lisans)
 Bayrak Fm (Fm 102.0 MHz) (Yerel R3 Lisans)
 Yıldız Fm (Fm 99.0 MHz) (Yerel R3 Lisans)
 Radyo Kadırga (Fm 96.0 MHz) (Yerel R2 Lisans)
 Radyo Trabzon (Fm 91.0 MHz) (Yerel R3 Lisans) (Eski ismi Sahil Fm)
 Radyo T (Fm 96.4 MHz) (Yerel R3 Lisans)
 Radyo Bordo Mavi (Fm 103.5 MHz) (Yerel R3 Lisans)
 Kuzey FM (Fm 97.8 MHz) (Yerel R3 Lisans)
 Taka FM (Fm 98.5 MHz) (Yerel R3 Lisans)
 Zigana Radyo (Fm 93.5 MHz) (Yerel R3 Lisans)
 Radyo KTÜ (Fm 106.2 MHz) (Üniversite Radyosu)

Afyon 
 FM 97.3 - RADYO LOJIK (Radyo Lojik AFYON)

External links 
 Radio stations in Istanbul - frequencies, transmitters and live streaming

 
Turkey
Radio stations